This article lists anime series that have aired on Fuji TV and its affiliates.

Current

1960s

1970s

1980s

1990s

2000s

2010s

2020s

Fuji
Fuji
Fuji TV original programming